Međurečje is a village located in the municipality of Rudo, Republika Srpska, Bosnia and Herzegovina. It is surrounded by the Serbian municipality of Priboj, in Zlatibor District, making it an exclave of Bosnia and Herzegovina, and an enclave within Serbia, 1130 meters from the rest of Bosnia and Herzegovina. While Serbia recognizes Međurečje as part of Bosnia and Herzegovina, the entire area is currently under the administration of the Serbian government. Sastavci is the neighboring village in Serbia.

Demographics
In 1999, the village had 75 households with a population of 270.

Vital infrastructure in the enclave of Međurečje is tied to the Serbian municipality of Priboj. A majority of the population works in Priboj. However, the land of Međurečje is registered in the municipality of Rudo (Bosnia and Herzegovina), where the population of the village pays its land tax.

History
Historic facts about the formation of the enclave within the territory of Serbia are not known, but it is believed to be tied to the period after the 1878 Congress of Berlin, when the Austro-Hungarian and Ottoman Empires were sharing the border and Austria-Hungary was allowed to annex Bosnia and Herzegovina.

References

External links
 Information and a map of the village
 Međurečje – "pedalj Bosne u Srbiji, zemlja svačija i ničija" at rts.rs

Enclaves and exclaves
Villages in Republika Srpska
Bosnia and Herzegovina–Serbia border crossings